Aphanotorulus is a genus of armored catfishes native to the Amazon, Orinoco, Essequibo and Jaguaribe basins in South America. They typically occur on a sand or gravel bottom in slow to moderately flowing rivers and streams, but some species occur in areas with fast current.

Taxonomy
The taxonomy of this genus has been a matter of dispute, all having been placed in Hypostomus in the past, and some occasionally placed in Squaliforma. Squaliforma is now regarded as a synonym of Aphanotorulus, but species west of the Andes have been moved to Isorineloricaria.

There are currently 7 recognized species of Aphanotorulus:

 Aphanotorulus ammophilus Armbruster & Page, 1996
 Aphanotorulus emarginatus (Valenciennes, 1840)
 Aphanotorulus gomesi (Fowler, 1941)
 Aphanotorulus horridus (Kner, 1854)
 Aphanotorulus phrixosoma (Fowler, 1940)
 Aphanotorulus rubrocauda Oliveira, Py-Daniel & Zawadzki, 2017
 Aphanotorulus unicolor (Steindachner, 1908)

Of these species, the validity of A. phrixosoma is questionable, as the only known specimen likely is a hybrid between A. horridus and A. unicolor.

References

Hypostominae
Fish of South America
Catfish genera
Taxa named by Isaäc J. H. Isbrücker
Taxa named by Han Nijssen
Freshwater fish genera